Anita Amenuku  (born 27 July 1985) is a Ghanaian women's international footballer who plays as a forward. She is a member of the Ghana women's national football team. She was part of the team at the 2007 FIFA Women's World Cup. On club level she plays for Ghatel Ladies in Ghana. She debuted for Ghana on 12 September 2007 against Australia.

See also
List of Ghana women's international footballers

References

1985 births
Living people
Ghanaian women's footballers
Ghana women's international footballers
Place of birth missing (living people)
2007 FIFA Women's World Cup players
Women's association football forwards